The 1992 Pontiac Excitement 400 was the third stock car race of the 1992 NASCAR Winston Cup Series season and the 38th iteration of the event. The race was held on Sunday, March 8, 1992, before an audience of 65,200 in Richmond, Virginia, at Richmond International Raceway, a 0.75 miles (1.21 km) D-shaped oval. The race took the scheduled 400 laps to complete. To fill out the top three, Leo Jackson Motorsports driver Harry Gant would finish third.

Background 

Richmond International Raceway (RIR) is a 3/4-mile (1.2 km), D-shaped, asphalt race track located just outside Richmond, Virginia in Henrico County. It hosts the Monster Energy NASCAR Cup Series and Xfinity Series. Known as "America's premier short track", it formerly hosted a NASCAR Camping World Truck Series race, an IndyCar Series race, and two USAC sprint car races.

Entry list 

 (R) denotes rookie driver.

Qualifying 
Qualifying was originally scheduled to be split into two rounds. The first round was held on Friday, March 6, at 2:30 PM EST. Originally, the first 20 positions were going to be determined by first round qualifying, with positions 21-40 meant to be determined the following day on Saturday, March 7. However, due to rain, the second round was cancelled. As a result, the rest of the starting lineup was set using the results from the first round.

Two drivers would fail to qualify.

Full qualifying results

Race results

Standings after the race 

Drivers' Championship standings

Note: Only the first 10 positions are included for the driver standings.

References 

1992 NASCAR Winston Cup Series
NASCAR races at Richmond Raceway
March 1992 sports events in the United States
1992 in sports in Virginia